Apeldoorn railway station (abbreviation: Apd) is a railway station in Apeldoorn in Gelderland, Netherlands. The station was opened on 15 May 1876, on the Amsterdam–Zutphen railway. It was opened when the Amersfoort to Zutphen section was completed.

Location 
The railway station is located at the Stationsplein in the town center of Apeldoorn in the province of Gelderland in the middle of the Netherlands. It is situated on the Amsterdam–Zutphen railway between the railway stations of Hoevelaken in the west and Apeldoorn De Maten in the east. It is also the western terminus of the Apeldoorn–Deventer railway before Apeldoorn Osseveld in the east and the northern terminus of the Apeldoorn–Dieren railway before Beekbergen in the south.

History 
The railway station was opened on 15 May 1876.

In 1887 there were local lines from Apeldoorn in three directions:
 Apeldoorn–Zwolle railway (dismantled)
 Apeldoorn–Dieren railway (now property of the VSM Steam Railway)
 Apeldoorn–Deventer railway in use since 1887.

The station building was saved in connection with a massive refurbishment of the station from 2004 to 2008.

Station building and layout 

The Apeldoorn station building is not related to any of the standard stations, but it has similarities with stations built in that period. It consists of an upper middle portion with two lower short side wings.

The station has eight tracks and four platforms.

The 2004–2008 refurbishment included, closure of the level crossings at and near the station where passengers and cyclists would pass to get to Apeldoorn Zuid and opening of a new cycle tunnel under the station, railway and the adjacent road. The front square of the station was renewed in conjunction with this. There are also lifts to go up to the platforms.

Services

Trains 

, the following train services call at this station:

 Express services:
 Intercity: Amsterdam - Amersfoort - Deventer - Hengelo - Osnabrück - Hanover - Berlin
 Intercity: Schiphol - Amersfoort - Deventer - Hengelo - Enschede
 Intercity: The Hague/Rotterdam - Utrecht - Amersfoort - Deventer - Hengelo - Enschede
 Intercity: Amsterdam - Amersfoort (- Deventer)
 Local services:
 Sprinter: Apeldoorn - Deventer - Almelo (- Hengelo - Enschede)
 Stoptrein: Apeldoorn - Zutphen

From 9 December 2012, Arriva operates the train between Apeldoorn and Zutphen. From the same date Apeldoorn no longer had a direct connection with Rotterdam on weekdays; a change of trains was required in Amersfoort or Utrecht. In the 2015 timetable, however, the direct connection to Rotterdam on weekdays has been restored by splitting/combining trains in Utrecht. The intercity Amsterdam - Deventer calls at Apeldoorn every hour during weekdays and twice an hour during peak hours, however, not at the times the intercity Amsterdam - Berlin calls at Apeldoorn.

From 11 December 2016, the local Sprinter service to Almelo is only extended towards Enschede during weekday peak hours, where it used to be all day until 20:00 during weekdays. This change was implemented as a result of regional subsidies from the local Twente government being revoked, and led to strong protests from commuters and especially students at university and high schools in Enschede.

Buses 

There is a large bus station next to the station. From here town and regional bus services operate. These buses are operated by Syntus, with certain journeys on service 43 operated by Breng. All bus services are frequent and connect with train services.

Town services
1 Station - Town Centre - Gelre Ziekenhuis Lukas
2 Station - Town Centre - Rijkskantoren/Apenheul
3 Station - Town Centre - Zutphensestraat - Station De Maten - Matenhoeve - Matenveld
4 Station - Town Centre - Zutphensestraat - Station De Maten - Matenveld - Matenhoeve
5 Station - Deventerstraat - Osseveld - Woudhuis
6 Station - Town Centre - Rijkskantoren - Orden
7 Station - Town Centre - Orden
8 Station - Town Centre - Anklaar - Zuidbroek
9 Station - Town Centre - Anklaar - Zuidbroek
10 Station - Town Centre - Het Loo - Kerschoten
11 Station - Kerschoten - Stadshoudersmolen - Vaassen
12 Station - Town Centre - Ugchelen
14 Station - Town Centre - Arnhemseweg - Kayersmolen - Kayersdijk - Station
15 Station - Deventerstraat - Teuge - Twello
16 Station - Town Centre - Berg en Bos - Het Loo
17 Station - Town Centre - Sprenklaar - Station
18 Station - Town Centre - Arnhemseweg - Zuid - Rivierenkwartier - Station
19 Station - Zuid - Componistenkwartier - Town Centre - Station

Regional services
43 Apeldoorn - Beekbergen - Loenen - Eerbeek - Laag-Soeren - Dieren - Rheden - Velp - Westervoort - Arnhem (Faster service to Arnhem on service 91 or 231)
91 Apeldoorn - Beekbergen - Arnhem North - Arnhem
102 Apeldoorn - Het Loo Palace - Julianatoren - Nieuw Millingen - Wittenberg - Voorthuizen - Terschuur - Zwartebroek - Hoevelaken Station - Amersfoort
104 Apeldoorn - Het Loo Palace - Julianatoren - Hoog Soeren - Nieuw Millingen - Uddel - Elspeet - Leuvenum - Ermelo - Harderijk (Not weekends, use 102 to Voorthuizen and change onto service 105)
108 Apeldoorn - Ugchelen - Hoenderloo - Hoge Veluwe National Park - Otterlo - Ede - Ede-Wageningen
109 Apeldoorn - De Maten - Loenen - Eerbeek
201 Apeldoorn - Apeldoorn North - Zwolle Express
202 Apeldoorn - Wenum - Vaassen - Emst - Epe - Heerde - Zwolle
203 Apeldoorn - Apeldoorn North - Epe - Heerde - Hattem - Zwolle
231 Apeldoorn - De Maten - Arnhem (Not weekends)
293 Apeldoorn - De Maten - Arnhem North - Arnhem HAN (School Days only)
400 Veluwetour Operates to many towns throughout the Veluwe at weekends

References

External links 

 Apeldoorn station, station information

1876 establishments in the Netherlands
Railway stations in Apeldoorn
Railway stations on the Apeldoorn - Deventer railway line
Railway stations on the Apeldoorn - Zutphen railway line
Railway stations opened in 1876
Railway stations in the Netherlands opened in the 19th century